Ricardo Anibal Araneda Aviles (born 3 January 1971 in Valdivia, Los Ríos Region) is a Chilean former professional boxer who competed from 2004 to 2005. As an amateur, he won a silver medal at the 1995 Pan American Games in Mar del Plata, Argentina and represented his native country at the 1996 Summer Olympics, where he lost in the first round. Araneda made his professional debut on May 7, 2004 in Santiago de Chile, defeating countryman Juan Reyes.

References
 
 sports-reference

1971 births
Living people
Cruiserweight boxers
Boxers at the 1992 Summer Olympics
Boxers at the 1996 Summer Olympics
Boxers at the 1995 Pan American Games
Olympic boxers of Chile
People from Valdivia
Chilean male boxers
Pan American Games silver medalists for Chile
Pan American Games medalists in boxing
Medalists at the 1995 Pan American Games
20th-century Chilean people
21st-century Chilean people